A114 may refer to:

RFA Derwentdale (A114), a ship
 A114 road (England), a road connecting Plaistow, Newham and Whipps Cross University Hospital
 A 114 motorway (Germany), a road connecting the A 10 (Berliner Ring) and the main center of Berlin
 A114 road (Malaysia), a road in Perak connecting Tanjung Tualang and Kampung Kuala Dipang